Gordon Van Gelder (born 1966) is an American science fiction editor.  From 1997 until 2014, Van Gelder was editor and later publisher of The Magazine of Fantasy & Science Fiction, for which he has twice won the Hugo Award for Best Editor Short Form. He was also a managing editor of The New York Review of Science Fiction from 1988 to 1993, for which he was nominated for the Hugo Award a number of times. As of January 2015, Van Gelder has stepped down as editor of Fantasy & Science Fiction in favor of Charles Coleman Finlay, but remains publisher of the magazine.

Biography
He was born in 1966. After graduating from Princeton University (where he edited a science fiction magazine called Infinity), Van Gelder started working as an editorial assistant at St. Martin's Press in 1988, later rising to full editor.  In January 1997, he became the editor of The Magazine of Fantasy & Science Fiction upon the resignation of Kristine Kathryn Rusch.  He continued working at St. Martin's until October 2000, when he bought the magazine from Edward L. Ferman to become its publisher.

During his tenure, F&SF became the second longest-running science fiction magazine, surpassing Amazing Stories in total number of issues published.  It is exceeded only by Astounding/Analog.  Van Gelder also began focusing on the publication of themed anthologies drawing from the magazine's back list rather than the best-of annuals published when Ferman was the magazine's publisher. He later edited a collection of notable stories from F&SF, The Very Best of Fantasy & Science Fiction, published by Tachyon Publications.

Van Gelder has made some behind-the-scenes changes to F&SF.  While the Fermans published the magazine through Mercury Press, Van Gelder founded his own press, Spilogale Inc., named for a genus of spotted skunk.  He has also moved the editorial offices from New York City to Jersey City, New Jersey. Van Gelder currently lives in Hoboken, New Jersey.  He has been an administrator of the Philip K. Dick Award since 1995 and an administrator of the World Fantasy Award since 2014. In 2011, OR Books released an anthology edited by Van Gelder, Welcome to the Greenhouse: Science Fiction on Climate Change, with an introduction by journalist Elizabeth Kolbert.

Family
Richard Van Gelder, his father, was Curator of Mammalogy at the American Museum of Natural History. Lawrence Van Gelder, an uncle of Van Gelder, was a senior editor at The New York Times until his retirement in 2008.

Van Gelder is also distantly related to noted Jazz recording engineer Rudy Van Gelder.

Bibliography

Books

Articles
F&SF editorials.
"A Few Thoughts on Jack Cady’s The Off Season" October 1, 2015 .
"The New Yorker Festival Panel ‘Nouveau Science Fiction’ " Locus magazine, November 2015.

References

External links

Interview at Green Man Review (late 1997 or early 1998?)
interview with Jayme Lynn Blaschke at SFSITE (1999)
Interview at Science Fiction Weekly (2001)
Interview by Richard Brignall at Strange Horizons  (May 2003)
Interview by Ken Rand at IROSF.COM (2004)
partial text of LOCUS interview April 2004
Interview by Celu Amberstone at SFCANADA (Winter 2006)
Interview at SFRevu (June 2007)
Interview by Lynne Jamneck (2007)
Interview by Wolfgang Trubshaw (March 2008)
Interview by Gareth D. Jones (Nov. 2008)
Interview by Jason Heninger at Tor.com (May 2009)
Interview by Jeremy L. C. Jones at Clarkesworld (June 2009)
Podcast interview by Rick Kleffel at The Agony Column (Aug. 2009)
Odyssey Workshop interview (Dec. 2013)
Excerpt of an interview by D. Blake Werts from The Digest Enthusiast #1 (Jan. 2015)
Welcome to the Greenhouse: Science Fiction on Climate Change anthology edited by Gordon Van Gelder (March 2011)
The Virtual Memories Show interview (Aug. 2017)
File 770 interview by Carl Slaughter (September 2017)
Geek's Guide to the Galaxy interview by David Barr Kirtley May 2018
 

1966 births
Living people
American book editors
American magazine editors
American speculative fiction critics
American speculative fiction editors
Place of birth missing (living people)
Hugo Award-winning editors
Princeton University alumni
Science fiction critics
Science fiction editors
The Magazine of Fantasy & Science Fiction people
Male speculative fiction editors